RIMS binding protein 2 is a protein that in humans is encoded by the RIMBP2 gene.

References

Further reading

External links 
 PDBe-KB provides an overview of all the structure information available in the PDB for Human RIMS-binding protein 2 (RIMBP2)

Genes
Human proteins